Cosmeptera is a genus of moths in the family Lasiocampidae. The genus was erected by Yves de Lajonquière in 1979.

Species
Cosmeptera hampsoni Leech, 1899
Cosmeptera ornata de Lajonquière, 1979
Cosmeptera pretiosa de Lajonquière, 1979
Cosmeptera pulchra de Lajonquière, 1979
Cosmeptera salvazai de Lajonquière, 1979

References

Lasiocampidae